Johnny is a 2003 Indian Telugu-language martial-arts film written and directed by Pawan Kalyan. Produced by Allu Aravind, the film starred Pawan Kalyan in the title role, while Renu Desai, Raghuvaran, and Raza Murad played pivotal roles. The film revolves around a martial arts coach who decides to use his skills to earn prize money in competitions required to save his wife suffering from blood cancer.

Johnny was released on April 25, 2003, to mixed to mostly negative reviews. Pawan Kalyan's acting was praised but the film didn't do well at the box office becoming one of the disasters in the Telugu film industry.It gained cult status. It also became the first-ever Telugu film to be released with over 250 prints worldwide including the United States. The film was screened at the International Film Festival of India.

Plot 
Johnny loses his mother when he was a kid. He runs away from his alcoholic father Ravishankar and dysfunctional family. Years later, from a small time club fighter, Johnny becomes a mixed martial arts coach. One day, a woman named Geetha lodges a police complaint on Johnny for beating up a man. Later, she discovers that it was a misunderstanding. Both become friends and eventually get married. After marriage, Johnny finds out that his wife is suffering from leukemia. He relocates to Mumbai to pay for her medical treatment and finds himself in dire need to pay for the medical expenses. While competing at an amateur kickboxing competition, Johnny is bought out by the organizer Tatya for a lump some offer to compete with two international martial artists. Johnny defeats them and earns a sum of  overnight, which he uses for Geeta's treatment.

Cast

Soundtrack 
The music for the film was composed by Ramana Gogula. The song "Ee Reyi Theyanadi" is based on the Chitti Chellelu (1970) song of the same name which itself was based on the French song L'amour est bleu (1967).

Distribution rights 
Johnny worldwide distribution rights were sold for a record breaking amount of 8.1 crore. Johnny was released in 325 Theaters worldwide with digital print quality.

References

External links 

2000s action drama films
2000s sports drama films
2003 drama films
2003 films
2003 martial arts films
Films about alcoholism
Films about dysfunctional families
Films about women in India
Films set in Mumbai
Geetha Arts films
Indian action drama films
Indian films about cancer
Indian martial arts films
Indian sports drama films
Kickboxing films
Mixed martial arts films
Sports films based on actual events
2000s Telugu-language films